Kapeli Pifeleti (born September 1, 1999) is a rugby union player who plays as a hooker and prop for Saracens in Premiership Rugby and the United States national team. Born in Tonga, Pifeleti has also represented the United States with the USA Selects and England with the England national under-18 team.

Club career

Saracens Academy
Pifeleti played for Saracens F.C. in 2017 and 2018, making appearances with the Saracens Storm and Saracens Under-18 sides.

San Diego Legion
In late 2018, it was announced that Pifeleti would play for the San Diego Legion during Major League Rugby's 2019 season. Pifeleti made his debut for the Legion on January 27, 2019, appearing as a substitute and playing at prop, in a 25–23 defeat to Rugby United New York. Pifeleti made his first start for the Legion on February 9, 2019, playing at hooker, in a 17–13 victory over Houston.

International career

England under-18 team
Pifeleti was named to the roster for the England national under-18 team in 2018.

USA Selects
Having lived several years in San Francisco while growing up, Pifeleti was eligible to play for the USA. Pifeleti was named to the roster for the USA Selects ahead of the 2018 Americas Pacific Challenge. However, he did not make an appearance for the team during the competition.

USA Eagles
Pifeleti made his debut for the USA Eagles on February 23, 2019, appearing as a substitute, in the Eagles' 33–28 victory over Brazil during the 2019 Americas Rugby Championship. Pifeleti qualified to represent the United States by meeting World Rugby's residency requirement.

Personal life
Pifeleti has an older brother, Fakaʻosi Pifeleti, who also plays rugby as a prop for the San Diego Legion. Their father, ʻOtenili Pifeleti, played rugby for the Tonga national and Samoa national teams, and served as captain of the former during the 1980s.

References

1999 births
Living people
United States international rugby union players
Rugby union hookers
Rugby union props
Tongan rugby union players
San Diego Legion players